Edmund Elisha Case (April 1844 – 1919) was an American painter active in Springfield, Massachusetts.

Background
Case was born in Suffield, Connecticut, but after his parents' deaths moved to Springfield, Massachusetts where he was educated in public schools and then at the Suffield Institute. He subsequently attended Eastman Business College in Poughkeepsie, New York, and served with the Navy in the Civil War, spending several months in Libby Prison.

From 1873 to 1875, he studied at the National Academy of Design, augmented by private studies with Joseph Oriel Eaton and visits to the Netherlands, Italy, France and England, with classes at the Académie Julian in Paris with Tony Robert-Fleury and William-Adolphe Bouguereau.

In 1875, Case returned to Springfield, where he remained for the rest of his life, painting local landscapes and still lives.

References 
 Spanierman Gallery entry
 "Obituary: Edmund E. Case," Springfield Republican, 4 November 1919.

External links
 Artwork by Edmund Elisha Case

19th-century American painters
American male painters
20th-century American painters
1844 births
1919 deaths
19th-century American male artists
20th-century American male artists